Cacio e pepe is a pasta dish from  the cuisine of the city of Rome. Cacio e pepe means "cheese and pepper" in several central Italian dialects. In keeping with its name, the dish contains grated Pecorino Romano cheese and black pepper, together with spaghetti, or traditionally tonnarelli. All the ingredients keep well for a long time, which made the dish practical for shepherds without fixed abode. Rough-surfaced pasta is recommended, to make the sauce adhere well.

Preparation
The pasta is prepared in boiling salted water as usual; it is then poured into the grated pecorino mixed with black pepper, with a little of the hot, starchy, cooking water. The heat melts the cheese, and the starches in the water help bind the pepper and cheese to the pasta.

Variants
While not traditional to cacio e pepe, seafood or bacon may be added, and other shapes of pasta such as rigatoni, always made with a rough surface, may be used.

See also
 Carbonara
 Italian cuisine
 List of pasta dishes

Notes

Sources
 

Cuisine of Lazio
Italian sauces
Pasta dishes